Perigea xanthioides, the red groundling moth or pied groundling moth, is a moth of the family Noctuidae. The species was first described by Achille Guenée in 1852. It is found from Canada to Brazil and on Jamaica. The wingspan is about 29 mm. The larvae feed on Vernonia and Eutrochium species.

References

Moths described in 1852
Condicinae
Moths of North America